Jianbing guozi or "deep-fried dough sticks rolled in a thin pancake" is a popular Chinese street food originating in Tianjin, and has been hailed as "one of China's most beloved street breakfasts", especially in Tianjin and the neighboring province of Hebei. It is a sub-category of jianbing and consists of pancakes made from mung bean flour, eggs, and youtiao (fried dough sticks) or crispy "dragons", served with sweet bean sauce, diced green onion, and optionally chili sauce.

History 

Jianbing guozi originated in northern China. Its history can be traced back 2,000 years to Shandong province during the Three Kingdoms period (220–280 AD). Legend holds that they were invented by Chancellor Zhuge Liang when he needed to feed his soldiers after they had lost their woks. He ordered the cooks to mix water with wheat flour to make batter, and then spread it on shields, or flat copper griddles over a flame. The dish supposedly raised the soldiers’ morale and helped them win the battle. After that, jianbing guozi was passed down through the generations in Shandong and gradually spread to different parts of China.

Cooking 
Jianbing guozi is prepared by cooking a thin batter on a griddle to form a crepe-like pastry and topping it with savory spreads and fillings, then wrapping it, as illustrated below in five steps.

Other varieties

Shandong-style jianbing guozi 
Jianbing guozi from Shandong province is typically crispier as the batter consists of a flour mixture that mainly contains coarse grains such as corn, sorghum and millet. Historically, Shandong-style Jianbing guozi was often served by rolling it with scallions or with meat soup. Nowadays, fillings such as sweet potatoes, lettuce and pork are also used.

Shanxi-style jianbing guozi 
Shanxi jianbing guozi uses wheat flour but is otherwise similar to Tianjin jianbing guozi.

Tahe-style jianbing guozi 
Tahe jianbing guozi (from Tahe, Heilongjiang) consists of processed meat, shredded potatoes, and other ingredients wrapped in a thin egg-and-flour pancake. It is slightly spicy and thicker in size.

Gallery of Jianbing guozi around the world

See also
 Jianbing
 List of street foods

References 

Street food in China
Tianjin cuisine
Pancakes
Breakfast dishes
Stuffed dishes